The Hot Club of San Francisco is an American gypsy jazz band. Led by guitarist, songwriter, and arranger Paul 'Pazzo' Mehling, the group uses the instrumentation of violin, bass, and guitars from Django Reinhardt and Stephane Grappelli’s  Quintette du Hot Club de France and performs arrangements of gypsy jazz standards, pop songs, and original compositions by Mehling. The Hot Club of San Francisco includes violinist Evan Price, the vocals of various members, and a swing rhythm section. In the book, Django Reinhardt and the Illustrated History of Gypsy Jazz, Michael Dregni refers to the Hot Club of San Francisco as "one of the first American gypsy jazz bands."

Biography
Mehling was exposed to the music of Django Reinhardt music at a young age through his father's record collection. As a teenager Mehling was inspired by seeing Dan Hicks and His Hot Licks, who drew on the music of Django Reinhardt, and by David Grisman’s Dawg Music, a blend of swing and bluegrass. Early in his career Mehling performed with the Abalone Stompers, a New Orleans style traditional Dixieland jazz band, freelanced with the Santa Cruz Symphony, played with the Magnolia Jazz Band, and formed his first Gypsy jazz band, The Hot Club of Friends. Mehling later traveled to Paris to further develop his gypsy jazz guitar technique and feel with Django-style guitarist Serge Krief. Mehling has stated that Krief's emphasis on the importance of emotion, mystery, and romance in gypsy music had a lasting impact on his development as a musician. In the late 1980s and early 1990s Mehling joined Dan Hicks' band, The Acoustic Warriors, appearing with them on the PBS show Austin City Limits.

Works and recognition
Nationally broadcast performances of the HCSF include the Public Radio Exchange's WoodSongs Old-Time Radio Hour series, and Stanford Libraries' Riverwalk Collection. A story on NPR station KQED-FM on the Hot Club of San Francisco referred to Mehling as "one of the Godfathers of the Gypsy jazz revival".
The Hot Club of San Francisco has released 15 albums, six of which were released on Mehling's Hot Club Records label. The group was the first American band invited to perform at the Festival Django Reinhardt in Samois sur Seine, in 2000. Mehling appeared in the 2005 film Jeremy Cohen and Friends Celebrate Joe Venuti, and performed on the soundtrack of the 2014 film My Old Lady.

Discography

References

Gypsy jazz musicians
Musical groups from San Francisco